Class K: Law is a classification used by the Library of Congress Classification system. This page outlines the sub-classes of Class K.

K - Law in general. Comparative and uniform law. Jurisprudence 

1-7720............Law in general. Comparative and uniform law. Jurisprudence
1-36.5...........Periodicals
37-44............Bibliography
46...............Monographic series
48...............Encyclopedias
50-54............Dictionaries. Words and phrases
58...............Maxims. Quotations
(64).............Yearbooks
68-70............Directories
85-89............Legal research
94...............Legal composition and draftsmanship
100-103..........Legal education
109-110..........Law societies. International bar associations
115-130..........The legal profession
133..............Legal aid. Legal assistance to the poor
140-165..........History of law
170..............Biography
(175)............Congresses
(176)-(177)......Collected works (nonserial)
(179)............Addresses, essays, lectures
181-184.7........Miscellany
190-195..........Ethnological jurisprudence. Primitive law
201-487..........Jurisprudence. Philosophy and theory of law
202.............Periodicals
212-213.........Methodology
215-218.........History
236.............Universality and non-universality of law
237-264.........The concept of law
270-274.........Acts and events
280-286.........Sources of law
288-296.........Interpretation and construction of law. Lacunae in law
300-304.........Classification of law. Typology
321-474.........Schools of legal theory
325-328........Historical jurisprudence
330-344........Positivism
366-380........Sociology of law. Sociological jurisprudence
400-474........Natural law
486-487.........Relation of law to other topics
520-5582.........Comparative law. International uniform law
524-525.........Treaties and other international agreements
540-546.........Trials
578-579.........Concepts applying to several branches of law
583-(591).......Legal systems compared
592-597.........Regional divisions. Interregional comparative law
600-615.........Private law
605-615........Unification
623-968.........Civil law (common law)
625-709........Persons
670-709.......Domestic relations. Family law
720-792........Property
795-798........Trusts and trustees
805-821........Succession upon death
830-968........Obligations
840-917.......Contracts
920...........Restitution. Quasi contracts. Unjust enrichment
923-968.......Torts
970.............Compensation to victims of crime. Reparation
1000-1395.......Commercial law
1010-1014......The merchant. Business enterprises
1021-1022......Commercial agency
1024-1132......Commercial contracts
1026-1045.....Sale of goods
1054-1065.5...Negotiable instruments
1066-1089.....Banking
1094-1096.....Loan of money
1100-1109.....Secured transactions
1112-1116.....Investments
1130-1132.....Carriage of goods and passengers. Carriers
1150-1231......Maritime law
1195-1223.....Maritime social legislation
1226-1231.....Marine insurance
1241-1287......Insurance
1301-1366......Business associations
1370-1395......Insolvency and bankruptcy. Creditors' rights
1401-1578.......Intellectual property
1411-1485......Copyright
1500-1578......Industrial property
1700-1973.......Social legislation
1701-1841......Labor law
1861-1929......Social insurance
1960-1973......Public welfare. Public assistance
2100-2385.......Courts. Procedure
2110-2155......Court organization and procedure
2201-2385......Civil procedure
2390............Negotiated settlement. Compromise
2400-2405.......Arbitration and award
3150............Public law
3154-3370.......Constitutional law
3161...........Constitutional history
3169...........The state
3171-3179......Constitutional principles
3184-3188......Form and structure of government
3195...........National territory
3201...........Foreign relations administration
3220...........Public policy
3224-3278......Individual and state
3280-3282......Church and state
3289-3367......Organs of government
3290-3304.....The people. Election law
3310-3329.....The legislature
3332-3363.....Heads of state and the central government
3367..........The judiciary
3370...........Constitutional courts and procedure
3375............Colonial law
3400-3431.......Administrative law
3402-3417......The administrative process
3420-3431......Administrative organization
3440-3460.......Civil service. Government officials and employees
3476-3560.......Public property. Public restraint on private property
3566-3578.......Public health
3581-(3598).....Environmental law
3601-3611.......Medical legislation
3615-3622.......Veterinary laws. Veterinary medicine and hygiene. Prevention of cruelty to animals
3625-3649.......Food. Drugs. Cosmetics
3651-3654.......Alcohol. Alcoholic beverages
3661-3674.......Public safety
3700-3705.......Control of social activities
3740-3762.......Education
3770-3795.......Science and arts. Research
3820-3836.......Economic constitution, policy, planning, and development
3840-4375.......Regulation of industry, trade, and commerce. Occupational law
3842-3862......Trade regulations. Control of trade practices
3870-3918......Primary production. Extractive industries
3921-3925......Manufacturing industries
3926-3935......Food processing industries
3941-3974......Trade and commerce
3978-3992......Public utilities
4011-4343......Transportation and communication
4360-4375......Professions and occupations
4430-4675.......Public finance
4453-4640......National revenue
4650-4675......State and local finance
4700-4705.......Government measures in time of war, national emergency, or economic crisis
4720-4780.......National defense. Military law
4725-4734......The military establishment. Armed forces
4740-4760......Military criminal law and procedure
5000-5582.......Criminal law and procedure
5015.4-5350....Criminal law
5401-5570......Criminal procedure
5575-5582......Juvenile criminal law and procedure
7000-7720........Private international law. Conflict of laws
7051-7054.......International unification, approximation, and harmonization
7060-7081.......Choice of law
7085............Retroactive law. Intertemporal law
7090............Juristic acts
7120-7197.......Persons
7125-7140......Natural persons
7145-7148......Juristic persons. Associations
7155-7197......Domestic relations. Family law
7157-7179......Marriage. Husband and wife
7181-7197......Parent and child. Guardian and ward
7200-7218.......Property
7222............Trust and trustees
7230-7245.......Succession upon death
7260-7338.......Obligations
7265-7305......Contracts
7310...........Restitution. Quasi contracts. Unjust enrichment
7315-7338......Torts
7340-7512.......Commercial law
7350-7444......Commercial contracts
7449-7460......Maritime law
7470...........Insurance
7485-7495......Business associations. Business corporations
7510-7512......Insolvency and bankruptcy. Creditors' rights
7550-7582.......Intellectual property
7555-7557......Copyright
7570-7582......Industrial property
7585-7595.......Social legislation
7611-7688.......Civil procedure. International civil procedure
7690............Arbitration and award
7720............Recognition of foreign administrative acts

KB - Religious law in general. Comparative religious law. Jurisprudence 

1-4855..............Religious law in general. Comparative religious law. Jurisprudence
2-4................Bibliography
7-68...............Periodicals
68.................Annuals. Annuaires
70.A-Z.............Monographic series. By title, A-Z
73.................Collections. Compilations (General and comprehensive)
74-78..............Auxiliary sciences KB90.A-Z Encyclopedias. Law dictionaries. Terms and phrases. Vocabularies. By author or title, A-Z
100.A-Z............Proverbia. Legal maxims. Brocardica juris. Regulae juris. By author or title, A-Z
122................Biography (Collective)
130................Legal research. Legal bibliography. Methods of bibliographic research
150................Conferences. Symposia
160................General works. Treatises
162-250............Legal systems compared
270-280............Theory, philosophy, and science of religious law
400-4855...........Interdisciplinary discussion of subjects
400...............Ritual law. Religious observances and rituals
410...............Law reform and policies. Criticism
479...............Private law (General)
480-482...........Private international law. Conflict of laws
491...............Civil law (General)
524-530...........Persons
531-619...........Domestic relations. Family law
622-628.5.........Guardianship. Guardian and ward
632-636.2.........Inheritance and succession
636.3.............Gifts. Charitable gifts. Donations
640-726...........Property. Res in commercio
810-962.8.........Obligations. Contracts and transactions
1270-1278.........Labor laws and legislation
1468-1550.........Social laws and legislation. Welfare. Charities
1572-1690.........Courts and procedure
2000-2035.........Public law. The State
2101-2862.........Constitutions and religion. Constitutional and administrative law
2870..............Civil service. Employees of state, communal agencies, and religious corporations
3000-3034.........Police and public safety
3040.5-3056.......Public property. Government property
3075-3096.5.......Public health
3098-3121.7.......Medical legislation
3122..............Veterinary medicine and hygiene. Veterinary public health
3123-3123.5.......Animal protection. Animal welfare. Animal rights
3124-3125.........Birth control. Family planning
3127-3135.........Environmental law
3137-3183.........Cultural affairs
3190-3429.........Economic law
3440-3500.7.......Transportation and communication
3515-3522.........Professions. Intelligentsia
3526-3694.........Public finance
3709-3726.........Government measures in time of war, national emergency, or economic crisis
3735-3780.........Military law
3790-4855.........Criminal law and procedure

KBM - Jewish law 

1-4855................Jewish law. Halakah
KBM523.6-523.72......Halakah
523.6...............Even ha-'ezer law (General)
523.72..............Hoshen mishpat law (General)
523.8-4855...........Mishpat Ivri
523.8...............Bibliography
523.9...............Legal education. Study and teaching
524.................General works
524.12-524.26.......The concept of Jewish law
524.3...............Sources of Jewish law (Mishpat Ivri)
524.32-.34..........Methodology of law development
524.36..............Influence of other legal systems on Jewish law
524.38..............Law reform and policies. Criticism
524.4.A-Z...........Concepts applying to several branches of the law, A-Z
524.42..............Private law
524.43..............Conflict of laws. Plurality of laws conflict
524.5...............Assistance in emergencies
524.6-530...........Persons
531-619.............Domestic relations. Family law
622-628.5...........Guardian and ward. Apotropos
632-636.2...........Inheritance and succession
636.3...............Gifts. Charitable gifts. Donations
639-1424............Dinei mamonot
1468-1547...........Social laws and legislation
1572-1942...........Courts and procedure
2000-2024...........Public law. The state and the Jewish community. Kehillah
2070-2614...........Constitutional law. Constitutional principles of the Jewish community
2711-2840...........Administrative law and process of communal agencies
2970................Civil service. Employees of communal agencies
3000-3036.5.........Police and public safety
3040.5-3073.........Public property. Communal property. Restraints on private property
3075-3097...........Public health
3098-3122...........Medical legislation
3124-3125...........Birth control. Family planning
3127-3134...........Environmental law
3137-3183...........Cultural affairs
3190-3436...........Economic law
3440-3504.5.........Transportation and communication
3515-3519...........Professions
3526-3695...........Public finance
3709-3729...........Measures in time of war, national emergency, or economic crisis
3738-3785...........Community defense. Military law
3790-4855...........Criminal law and procedure

KBP - Islamic law 

1-4860..............Islamic law. Shari'ah. Fiqh
2.2-8..............Bibliography
9.5................Monographic series
10-14.5............Societies. Associations
15.................Congresses. Conferences
18.................Academies. Institutes
40.................Encyclopedias. Dictionaries
40.2...............Maxims. Quotations
40.5...............Directories
41.................Legal research
42-43..............Legal education. Study and teaching
50-69..............History, development and application of Islamic law
70-75.4............Biography
100-136.8..........Sources
144................General works
173.25-.6..........Islamic law and other disciplines or subjects
174-190.5..........Observances and practice of Islam
250-420............Schools of thought. Islamic legal schools. Madhahib
425-466.3..........Usul al-fiqh. Jurisprudence and theory of law. Science of legal reasoning
469................Influence of other legal systems on Islamic law
470................Law reform. Criticism. Tanzim
480-485............Conflict of laws. Tanazu' al-qawanin
490-4860...........Furu' al-fiqh. Substantive law. Branches of law
490.2-490.95......General works. Treatises
491-497.95........Particular genres
500-509.8.........General concepts
524-638...........Ahal shakhsiyah
639-1154..........Mu'amalat
1155-1194.........Intellectual and industrial property
1234-1259.........Unfair competition
1270-1467.........Labor laws and legislation
1468-1569.........Social laws and legislation
1572-1942.........Courts and procedure
2000-2035.........Public law. The state and Islam
2101-2612.........Constitution of the state. Constitutional law
2730-2968.........Government and administration. Siyasah. Administrative process
2970..............Civil service. Employees of communal agencies
3000-3037.........Police and public safety
3040.5-3072.......Public property. Government property
3075-3096.5.......Public health
3098-3121.5.......Medical legislation
3122..............Veterinary medicine and hygiene. Veterinary public health
3123-3123.5.......Animal protection. Animal welfare. Animal rights
3124-3125.........Birth control. Family planning
3127-3135.........Environmental law
3137-3183.3.......Cultural affairs
3190-3437.........Economic law
3440-3512.........Transportation and communication
3515-3521.........Professions. Intelligentsia
3526-3705.........Public finance
3709-3727.........Government measures in time of war, national emergency, or economic crisis
3738-3785.........Military law
3790-4860.........Criminal law and procedure

KBR - History of canon law 

2-4090.............History of canon law
2-19..............Bibliography
21................Annuals. Annuaires. Yearbooks
22................Monographic series
27-41.7...........Official acts of the Holy See
42-54.5...........Decisions of ecclesiastical tribunals and courts, and related materials
56................Encyclopedias. Law dictionaries. Terms and phrases. Vocabularia
64................Directories
74-83.............Auxiliary sciences
100.A-Z...........Proverbia. Legal maxims. Brocardica juris. Regulae juris
105.A-Z...........Formularies. Clauses and forms. Formularia
122-124...........Collective biography of canonists or jurists
127-129.5.........Trials
130-132...........Legal research. Legal bibliography. Methods of bibliographic research
133-134...........Legal education. Study and teaching
136-148...........Societies. Associations. Academies, etc.
150...............Conferences. Symposia
160...............General works
190-2154.5........Sources
2155-2157.........Canon law and other disciplines or subjects
2160-2204.5.......Canonical jurisprudence. Canonical science
2205-2206.3.......Influence of other legal systems on Canon law
2207..............Law reform and policies. Criticism
2208.A-Z..........General concepts and principles, A-Z
2224-2295.........Ius ecclesiasticum privatum
2310-3026.........Constitution of the Church
3040-3070.........The teaching office of the church. Magisterium. De ecclesiae munere docendi
3077-3165.........Sacraments. Administration of sacraments. De sacramentis et administratione
3180-3182.........Sacramentals. Sacramentalia
3184-3256.........Other acts of divine worship. De ceteris actibus Cultus Divini
3264-3280.........Social work of the Church. Public welfare. Caritas
3320-3460.........Church property. Church economics and finance. Administration
3500-3774.........Penal (Criminal) law. De lege poenali
3780-3983.........Judiciary. Ecclesiastical courts and procedure. De processibus
4000-4090.........Church and state relationships. De relationibus inter ecclesiam et status. Ius publicum ecclesiae

KBS - Canon law of Eastern churches 

3-4010..............Canon law of Eastern churches
3-7................Bibliography
30-31..............Official acts. Documents
42.................Decisions of ecclesiastical tribunals and courts (Collective)
44-108.............Encyclopedias. Law dictionaries. Trials
110................Legal research. Legal bibliography. Methods of bibliographic research
112................Legal education. Study and teaching
113................Societies. Associations
120................Congresses. Conferences
125................Canon law of Eastern churches and other disciplines or subjects (not A-Z)
130................General (Comparative)
132-287............History
301-320.2..........Assyrian Church of the East. East Syrian Church
320.5-370.6........Pre-Chalcedonian churches
371-4010...........Orthodox Eastern Church

KBT - Canon law of Eastern Rite Churches in Communion with the Holy See of Rome  

3-4300..............Canon law of Eastern Rite Churches in Communion with the Holy See of Rome
3-7................Bibliography
30-44..............Official acts. Documents
102-108............Trials
110................Legal research. Legal bibliography. Methods of bibliographic research
112................Legal education. Study and teaching
113................Societies. Associations
120................Congresses. Conferences
125................Canon law of Eastern churches and other disciplines or subjects (not A-Z)
130................General (Comparative)
132-280............History
291-390............By subject (general and comparative)
395-4300...........Individual churches sui juris and ritual traditions

KBU - Law of the Roman Catholic Church. The Holy See 

2-19..............Bibliography
21................Annuals. Annuaires. Yearbooks
22................Monographic series
25-26.............Official gazette of the Holy See
26.8-41.5.........Official acts of the Holy See
42-54.5...........Decisions of ecclesiastical tribunals and courts, and related materials
56................Encyclopedias
56.5..............Dictionaries. Terms and phrases. Vocabularies
64................Directories
102...............Form books. Clauses and forms
127-129.5.........Trials
130-132...........Legal research. Legal bibliography. Methods of bibliographic research
133...............Legal education. Study and teaching
136-148...........Societies. Associations. Academies, etc.
149...............Academies. Institutes
150...............Conferences. Symposia
160...............General works
180.A-Z...........Works on diverse aspects of a particular subject and falling within several branches of the law. By subject, A-Z
195-1565..........Collections. Compilations. Selections
2155-2157.........Canon law and other disciplines or subjects
2160-2204.........Canonical jurisprudence. Theory and science of canon law
2205-2206.........Influence of other legal systems on canon law
2207..............Law reform and policies. Criticism
2208.A-Z..........Concepts applying to several branches of the law, A-Z
2210-2212.........The codes of canon law
2215-2308.........General norms and principles. De normis generalibus
2310-3026.........Constitution of the Church
3040-3070.........The teaching office of the Church. Magisterium. De ecclesiae munere docendi
3075-3165.........Sacraments. Administration of sacraments. De sacramentis et administratione
3180-3182.........Sacramentals. Sacramentalia
3184-3256.........Other acts of divine worship. De ceteris actibus Cultus Divini
3264-3280.........Social work of the Church. Public welfare. Caritas
3282-3310.........Medical ethics and legislation. Church policy
3320-3460.........Church property. Church economics and finance
3500-3774.........Sanctions in the Church. Criminal law. De sanctionibus in Ecclesia. De lege poenali
3780-3985.........Courts and procedure. De processibus
4000-4097.........Church and state relationships. De relationibus inter ecclesiam et status. Ius publicum ecclesiae
4112-4820.........Local Church government

KD - United Kingdom

KD - Law of England and Wales 
51-9500............England and Wales
8850-9312.........Local England Laws
9320-9355.........Local Welsh Laws
9400-9500.........Wales

KDC - Law of Scotland 

51-990.........Scotland

KDE - Law of Northern Ireland 

21-580.........Northern Ireland

KDG - Law of Isle of Man 

26-540.........Isle of Man. Channel Islands

KDK - Law of Ireland 

21-1950.........Ireland (Eire)

KDZ - Law of America. North America 

1101-1199.........Organization of American States (OAS)

2001-2499.2.......Bermuda

3001-3499.........Greenland

4001-4499.........St. Pierre and Miquelon

KE - Canada

KE - Federal Laws of Canada 
1-9450.........Federal law. Common and collective provincial law

KEA - Alberta 

1-599........Alberta

KEB - British Columbia 

1-599........British Columbia

KEM - Manitoba 

1-599........Manitoba

KEN - New Brunswick. Newfoundland. Northwest Territories. Nova Scotia. Nunavut 

1-599............New Brunswick

1201-1799........Newfoundland

5201-5999........Northwest Territories

7401-7999........Nova Scotia

8001-8999........Nunavut

KEO - Ontario 

1-1199........Ontario

KEP - Prince Edward Island 

1-599........Prince Edward Island

KEQ - Quebec 

1-1199.........Law of Quebec

KES - Saskatchewan 

1-599........Saskatchewan

KEY - Yukon Territory 

1-599........Yukon Territory

KEZ - Individual city laws 

1-9999.........Individual cities, A-Z

KF - United States

KF - Federal Laws of the United States 
1-9827.........Federal law. Common and collective state law

KFA - Alabama. Alaska. Arizona. Arkansas 

1-599............Alabama

1201-1799........Alaska

2401-2999.........Law of Arizona

3601-4199.........Law of Arkansas

KFC - California. Colorado. Connecticut 

1-1199............Law of California

1801-2399.........Law of Colorado

3601-4199.........Law of Connecticut

KFD - Delaware. District of Columbia 

1-599........Delaware

1201-1799........District of Columbia

KFF - Florida 

1-599.........Law of Florida

KFG - Georgia 

1-599.........Law of Georgia

KFH - Hawaii 

1-599........Hawaii

KFI - Idaho. Illinois. Indiana. Iowa 

1-599............Idaho

1201-1799........Illinois

3001-3599........Indiana

4201-4799........Iowa

KFK - Kansas. Kentucky 

1-599.............Law of Kansas

1201-1799.........Law of Kentucky

KFL - Louisiana 

1-599.........Law of Louisiana

KFM - Maine. Maryland. Massachusetts. Michigan. Minnesota. Mississippi. Missouri. Montana 

1-599.............Law of Maine

1201-1799.........Law of Maryland

2401-2999.........Law of Massachusetts

4201-4799.........Law of Michigan

5401-5999.........Law of Minnesota

6601-7199.........Law of Mississippi

7801-8399.........Law of Missouri

9001-9599.........Law of Montana

KFN - Nebraska. Nevada. New Hampshire. New Jersey. New Mexico. New York. North Carolina. North Dakota 

1-599............Law of Nebraska

601-1199.........Law of Nevada

1201-1799........Law of New Hampshire

1801-2399........Law of New Jersey

3601-4199........Law of New Mexico

5001-6199........Law of New York

7401-7999........Law of North Carolina

8601-9199........Law of North Dakota

KFO - Ohio. Oklahoma. Oregon 

1-599.............Law of Ohio

1201-1799.........Law of Oklahoma

2401-2999.........Law of Oregon

KFP - Pennsylvania 

1-599.........Law of Pennsylvania

KFR - Rhode Island 

1-599.........Law of Rhode Island

KFS - South Carolina. South Dakota 

1801-2399.........Law of South Carolina

3001-3599.........Law of South Dakota

KFT - Tennessee. Texas 

1-599.............Law of Tennessee

1201-1799.........Law of Texas

KFU - Utah 

1-599.........Law of Utah

KFV - Vermont. Virginia 

1-599.............Law of Vermont

2401-2999.........Law of Virginia

KFW - Washington. West Virginia. Wisconsin. Wyoming 

1-599.............Law of Washington (state)

1201-1799.........Law of West Virginia

2401-2999.........Law of Wisconsin

4201-4799.........Law of Wyoming

KFX - Individual cities 

1-9999........individual cities, A-Z

KFZ - Northwest Territory. Confederate States of America 

1801-2399........Northwest Territory

8601-9199........Confederate States of America

KG - Latin America

KG - Laws of Latin America (General). Mexico and Central America 
1-999............Latin America (General)

3001-3999........Mexico and Central America (General)

KGA - Belize 

1-9000........Belize

KGB - Costa Rica 

1-9000........Costa Rica

KGC - El Salvador 

1-9800........El Salvador

KGD - Guatemala 

1-9990........Guatemala

KGE - Honduras 

1-9990........Honduras

KGF - Mexico 

1-9900........Mexico

KGG - Nicaragua 

1-9800........Nicaragua

KGH - Panama 

1-8000...........Panama

9001-9299........Panama Canal Zone

KGJ - West Indies. Caribbean area. Anguilla 

1-999.........General Laws of West Indies. Caribbean area

7001-7499.......Anguilla

KGK - Antigua and Barbuda. Aruba 

1-499............Antigua and Barbuda

1001-1499........Aruba

KGL - Bahamas. Barbados. Bonaire. British Leeward Islands. British Virgin Islands. British West Indies. British Windward Islands 

1-499............Bahamas

1001-1499........Barbados

2001-2499........Bonaire

3001-3499........British Leeward Islands

4001-4499........British Virgin Islands

5001-5999........British West Indies

6001-6499........British Windward Islands

KGM - Cayman Islands 

1-499........Cayman Islands

KGN - Cuba 

1-9800........Cuba

KGP - Curaçao. Dominica 

1-499............Curaçao

2001-2499........Dominica

KGQ - Dominican Republic 

1-9800........Dominican Republic

KGR - Dutch Leeward Islands. Dutch West Indies. Dutch Windward Islands. French West Indies. Grenada. Guadeloupe 

1-499............Dutch Leeward Islands (General)

1001-1499........Dutch West Indies (Netherlands Antilles)

2001-2499........Dutch Windward Islands (General)

3001-3499........French West Indies (General)

4001-4499........Grenada

5001-5499........Guadeloupe

KGS - Haiti 

1-9000........Haiti

KGT - Jamaica. Martinique. Montserrat 

1-499............Jamaica

1001-1499........Martinique

2001-2499........Montserrat

KGU - Navassa islands 

1-499........Navassa islands

KGV - Puerto Rico 

1-8200........Puerto Rico

KGW - Saba. Saint Christopher (Saint Kitts), Nevis and Anguilla. Saint Lucia. Saint Vincent & the Grenadines. Sint Eustatius. Sint Maartin 

1-499............Saba

2001-2499........Saint Christopher (Saint Kitts), Nevis, and Anguilla

3001-3499........Saint Lucia

5001-5499........Saint Vincent and the Grenadines

7001-7499........Sint Eustatius

8001-8499........Sint Maarten

KGX - Trinidad & Tobago 

1-499........Trinidad & Tobago

KGY - Turks & Caicos Islands 

1-499........Turks & Caicos Islands

KGZ - Virgin Islands of the United States 

1-499........Virgin Islands of the United States

KH - South America

KH - Laws of South America (General) 
1-999........South America (General)

KHA - Argentina 

1-9800........Argentina

KHC - Bolivia 

1-8200........Bolivia

KHD - Brazil 

1-9900........Brazil

KHF - Chile 

1-9800........Chile

KHH - Colombia 

1-9900........Colombia

KHK - Ecuador 

1-9990........Ecuador

KHL - Falkland Islands 

1-9000........Falkland Islands

KHM - French Guiana 

1-9000........French Guiana

KHN - Guyana 

1-9000........Guyana

KHP - Paraguay 

1-9700........Paraguay

KHQ - Peru 

1-9800........Peru

KHS - Surinam 

1-9000........Surinam

KHU - Uruguay 

1-9800........Uruguay

KHW - Venezuela 

1-9900.........Venezuela

KJ - Europe. History. Countries A-F

KJ - History of Law in Europe 
2-1040.........History of Law
160-1040.........Germanic law

KJA - Roman law 

2-3660.........Roman law

KJC - Regional and uniform law 

2-9799.........Regional and uniform law

KJE - Regional organization and integration. Comparative law 

5-7975.........Regional organization and integration. Comparative law

KJG - Albania 

1-4999........Albania

KJH - Andorra 

1-499........Andorra

KJJ - Austria 

1-4999........Austria

KJK - Belgium. Bosnia and Hercegovina 

1-4999........Belgium

8001-8699........Bosnia and Hercegovina

KJM - Bulgaria. Croatia 

1-4999...........Bulgaria

7001-7505........Croatia

KJN - Cyprus 

1-499........Cyprus

KJP - Czechoslovakia. Bohemia. Czech Socialist Republic. Moravia-Silsia. Moravia. Ruthenia. Slovakia. Czech Republic (1993-) 

1-4999...........Czechoslovakia (to 1993)

5001-5009........Bohemia

5051-5149........Czech Socialist Republic

5201-5209........Moravia-Silsia (Land)

5211-5219........Moravia

5251-5259........Ruthenia

5261-5269........Slovak Socialist Republic

5301-5309........Slovakia (Independent republic, 1939-1945)

5361-5369........Slovakia (land)

5401-5899........Czech Republic (1993-)

KJQ - Slovakia (1993-) 

1-499........Slovakia (1993-)

KJR - Denmark 

1-4999........Denmark

KJS - Estonia 

1-4985........Estonia

KJT - Finland 

1-4999........Finland

KJV - France (National) 

2-9158.........National laws of France

KJW - France (Regional) 

51-4360.........Individual regions, provinces, departments, etc.

5201-9600.........Individual cities

KK - Europe. Countries G-Z

KK - Germany. West Germany 

2-9799.3........Germany. Law of West Germany

KKA - East Germany 

7-9796........East Germany

KKB - German States and Provinces (A-Pr) 

101-9399........German States and Provinces (A-Pr)

KKC - German States and Provinces (Ps-Z) 

101-4319........German States and Provinces (Ps-Z)

KKE - Greece 

1-4999........Greece

KKF - Hungary 

1-4999........Hungary

KKG - Iceland 

1-499.........Iceland

KKH - Italy. Kosovo 

1-4999........Italy

9901-9999.....Kosovo

KKI - Latvia 

1-4890........Latvia

KKJ - Liechtenstein. Lithuania 

1-499...........Liechtenstein

501-9890........Lithuania

KKK - Luxembourg. Macedonia (Republic, 1992-). Malta 

1-499............Luxembourg

501-999..........Macedonia (Republic, 1992-) 

1001-1499........Malta

KKL - Monaco. Montenegro 

1-499............Monaco

1001-1505........Montenegro

KKM - Netherlands 

1-4999........Netherlands

KKN - Norway 

1-4999........Norway

KKP - Poland 

1-4999........Poland

KKQ - Portugal 

1-4999........Portugal

KKR - Romania 

1-4999........Romania

KKS - San Marino. Serbia (2006-). Slovenia (1992-) 

1-499............San Marino

1001-1505........Serbia (2006-) 

6001-6505........Slovenia (1992-)

KKT - Spain 

1-4999........Spain

KKV - Sweden 

1-4999........Sweden

KKW - Switzerland 

1-4999........Switzerland

KKX - Turkey 

1-4999........Turkey

KKY - Ukraine (1991-). Vatican City 

1-4999........Ukraine (1991-) 

7001-7099.....Vatican City. Stato Pontificio

KKZ - Yugoslavia 

1-4999........Yugoslavia

KL - Asia and Eurasia. History. Countries (A-Z)

KL - History of law. The ancient orient 

2-135...........General
147-177.........Ancient legal systems compared
190-420.........Sources
700-2215........Mesopotamia. Assyro-Babylonian law
1000-1299.......Sumer
1600-1899.......Assyria
2200-2499.......Babylonia
2800-3099.......Egypt
3500-3799.......Elam
4101-4399.......Greek law
4700-4999.......Hittite law
5300-5599.......Persia
5900-6199.......Phoenicia

KLA - Russia. Soviet Union 

1-9999........Russia. Soviet Union

KLB - Russia (Federation, 1992-) 

1-6499........Russia (Federation, 1992-)

KLD - Armenian S.S.R. (to 1991) 

1-490........Armenian S.S.R. (to 1991)

KLE - Azerbaijan 

1-490........Azerbaijan

KLF - Belarus (Republic) 

1-490........Belarus (Republic)

KLH - Georgia (Republic) 

1-490........Georgia (Republic)

KLM - Moldova 

1-490.........Moldova

KLN - Russian S.F.S.R. (to 1991) 

1-489.........Russian S.F.S.R. (to 1991)

KLP - Ukraine. Zakavkazskaia Sotsialisticheskaia Federativnaia Sovetskaia Respublika 

1-4989.........Ukraine (1919-1991)

9001-9499.........Zakavkazskaia Sotsialisticheskaia Federativnaia Sovetskaia Respublika (to 1936)

KLQ - Bukharskaia Narodnaia Sovetskaia Respublika (to 1924) 

1-499.........Bukharskaia Narodnaia Sovetskaia Respublika (to 1924)

KLR - Kazakhstan. Khorezmskaia Sovetskaia Sotsialisticheskaia Respublika 

1-490.........Kazakhstan

1001-1499.........Khorezmskaia Sovetskaia Sotsialisticheskaia Respublika (to 1924)

KLS - Kyrgyzstan 

1-490.........Kyrgyzstan

KLT - Tajikistan 

1-490.........Tajikistan

KLV - Turkmenistan 

1-490.........Turkmenistan

KLW - Uzbekistan 

1-490.........Uzbekistan

KM - Middle East

KM - General Laws of the Middle East 

1-999.........General

KMC - Regional comparative and uniform law 

1-799.........Regional comparative and uniform law

KME - Regional organization and integration 

10-799.........Regional organization and integration

KMF - Armenia. Bahrain 

1-293.5........Armenia (Republic)

1001-1490........Bahrain

KMG - Gaza 

1-489........Gaza

KMH - Iran 

1-4990........Iran

KMJ - Iraq 

1-4990........Iraq

KMK - Israel 

1-4990........Israel

KML - Jerusalem 

1-490........Jerusalem

KMM - Jordan. West Bank 
1-490.........Jordan

501-994.........West Bank (Territory under Israeli occupation, 1967- )

KMN - Kuwait 

1-499.........Kuwait

KMP - Lebanon 

1-490.........Lebanon

KMQ.........Oman. Palestine (to 1948) 

1-490.........Oman

1001-1499.........Palestine (to 1948)

KMS - Qatar 

1-490.........Qatar

KMT - Saudi Arabia 

1-4990.........Saudi Arabia

KMU - Syria 

1-490.........Syria

KMV - United Arab Emirates 

1-9870.........United Arab Emirates

KMX - Yemen 

1001-1526.........Yemen

KMY - Yemen (People's Democratic Republic, to 1990) 

1-489.........Yemen (People's Democratic Republic, to 1990)

KN - South Asia. Southeast Asia. East Asia. Countries (A-J)

KNC - Regional comparative and uniform law 

1-999.........Regional comparative and uniform law

KNE - Regional organization and integration 

150-499.........Regional organization and integration

KNF - Afghanistan 

1-4990.........Afghanistan

KNG - Bangladesh 

1-4990.........Bangladesh

KNH - Bhutan 

1-490.........Bhutan

KNK - Brunei 

1-490.........Brunei

KNL - Burma 

1-4990.........Burma

KNM - Cambodia 

1-4990.........Cambodia

KNN - China 

1-9000.........China

KNP - China (Republic, 1949- ). Taiwan 

1-599.........China (Republic, 1949- ). Taiwan

KNQ - China (People's Republic, 1949- ) 

1-9665.........China (People's Republic, 1949- )

KNR - Hong Kong 

1-489.........Hong Kong

KNS - India 

1-4999.........India

KNT - States of India (A-L) 

1-9502........States, and cities of India (A-L)

KNU - States of India (M-Z) 

1-9502........States, and cities of India (M-Z)

KNV - French Indochina (to 1946) 

1-489.........French Indochina (to 1946)

KNW - Indonesia. East Timor 

1-4990.........Indonesia

5001-5490......East Timor

KNX - Japan 

1-4999.........Japan

KNY - Cities of Japan 

10-220.........Cities, etc.

KP - South Asia. Southeast Asia. East Asia. Countries (K-Z)

KPA - Korea, South 

1-4990.........South Korea

KPC - Korea, Democratic People's Republic of 

1-4990.........Democratic People's Republic of Korea. North Korea

KPE - Laos 

1-4990.........Laos

KPF - Macao 

1-489.........Macao

KPG - Malaysia 

1-6999.........Malaysia

7001-9999.........States of East and West Malaysia (1957-, A-N)

KPH.........Malaysian States. Maldives 

1-4990.........States of East and West Malaysia (1957-, M-Z)

5001-5490.........Maldives

KPJ - Mongolia 

1-490.........Mongolia

KPK - Nepal 

1-490.........Nepal

KPL - Pakistan 

1-4990.........Pakistan

KPM - Philippines 

1-4990.........Philippines

KPP - Singapore 

1-499.........Singapore

KPS - Sri Lanka 

1-4990.........Sri Lanka

KPT - Thailand 

1-4990.........Thailand

KPV - Vietnam

1-8094.........Vietnam

KPW - Vietnam. South Vietnam 

1-489.........South Vietnam

KQ - Africa. History. Indigenous peoples. Countries (A-Ca)

KQ - African History of law. Law of indigenous peoples 

2-197.........History of law

2010-9000........Law of indigenous peoples

KQC - Regional comparative and uniform law 

1-999.........Regional comparative and uniform law

KQE - Regional organization and integration 

10-1249.........Regional organization and integration

KQG - Algeria 

1-4990.........Algeria

KQH - Angola 

1-4990.........Angola

KQJ - Benin 

1-490.........Benin

KQK - Botswana 

1-490.........Botswana

KQM - British Central Africa Protectorate 

1-499.........British Central Africa Protectorate

KQP - British Indian Ocean Territory. British Somaliland 

1-499.........British Indian Ocean Territory

1001-1499.........British Somaliland

KQT - Burkina Faso 

1-490.........Burkina Faso

KQV - Burundi 

1-490.........Burundi

KQW - Cameroon 

1-8020.........Cameroon

KQX - Cape Verde 

1-490.........Cape Verde

KR - Africa Countries (Ce-Gi)

KRB - Central African Republic 

1-490.........Central African Republic

KRC - Chad 

1-490.........Chad

KRE - Comoros 

1-490.........Comoros

KRG - Congo 

1-490.........Congo

KRK - Djibouti 

1-490.........Djibouti

KRL - East Africa Protectorate 

1-490.........East Africa Protectorate

KRM - Egypt 

1-4990.........Egypt

KRN - Eritrea 

1-499.........Eritrea

KRP - Ethiopia 

1-4990.........Ethiopia

KRR - French Equatorial Africa 

1-499.........French Equatorial Africa

KRS - French West Africa

1-499.........French West Africa

KRU - Gabon 

1-490.........Gabon

KRV - Gambia 

1-489.........Gambia

KRW - German East Africa 

1-499.........German East Africa

KRX - Ghana 

1-4990.........Ghana

KRY - Gibraltar 

1-499.........Gibraltar

KS - Africa Countries (Gu - Niger)

KSA - Guinea 

1-490.........Guinea

KSC - Guinea-Bissau 

1-490.........Guinea-Bissau

KSE.........Equatorial Guinea. Ifni 

1-490...........Equatorial Guinea

601-699.........Ifni

KSG.........Italian East Africa. Italian Somaliland 

1-499.............Italian East Africa

1001-1499.........Italian Somaliland

KSH - Ivory Coast 

1-4990.........Ivory Coast

KSK - Kenya 

1-4990.........Kenya

KSL - Lesotho 

1-490.........Lesotho

KSN - Liberia 

1-490.........Liberia

KSP - Libya 

1-4990.........Libya

KSR - Madagascar 

1-490.........Madagascar

KSS - Malawi 

1-490.........Malawi

KST - Mali 

1-490.........Mali

KSU - Mauritania 

1-490.........Mauritania

KSV - Mauritius. Mayotte 

1-490.........Mauritius

5001-5490.........Mayotte

KSW - Morocco 

1-4990.........Morocco

KSX - Mozambique 

1-4990.........Mozambique

KSY - Namibia 

1-4990.........Namibia

KSZ - Niger 

1-490.........Niger

KT - Africa Countries (Nigeria-Z)

KTA - Nigeria 

1-9150.........Nigeria

KTC - Réunion 

1-499.........Réunion

KTD - Rwanda 

1-490.........Rwanda

KTE - Saint Helena 

1-490.........Saint Helena

KTF - São Tomé and Príncipe 

1-490.........São Tomé and Príncipe

KTG - Senegal 

1-4990.........Senegal

KTH - Seychelles 

1-490.........Seychelles

KTJ - Sierra Leone 

1-490.........Sierra Leone

KTK - Somalia 

1-490.........Somalia

KTL - South Africa, Republic of 

1-9560.........Republic of South Africa

KTN - Spanish West Africa. Spanish Sahara 

1-499.........Spanish West Africa (to 1958)

601-699.........Spanish Sahara (to 1975)

KTM - Sudan, South 

1-489.........South Sudan (2011-)

KTQ - Sudan 

1-4990.........Sudan

KTR - Swaziland 

1-490.........Swaziland

KTT - Tanzania 

1-9910.........Tanzania

KTU - Togo 

1-490.........Togo

KTV - Tunisia 

1-4990.........Tunisia

KTW - Uganda 

1-490.........Uganda

KTX - Zaire 

1-4990.........Zaire

KTY - Zambia. Zanzibar 

1-490.........Zambia

1501-1599.........Zanzibar (to 1964)

KTZ - Zimbabwe 

1-490.........Zimbabwe

KU - Australia. New Zealand

KU - Australia 

1-4999.........Australia

KUA - Australian Capital Territory 

1-499.........Australian Capital Territory

KUB - Northern Territory 

1-499.........Northern Territory

KUC - New South Wales 

1-499.........New South Wales

KUD - Queensland 

1-499.........Queensland

KUE - South Australia 

1-499.........South Australia

KUF - Tasmania 

1-499.........Tasmania

KUG - Victoria 

1-499.........Victoria

KUH - Western Australia 

1-499.........Western Australia

KUN - Norfolk Island. Cities of Australia 

501-599...........Norfolk Island

3001-3050.........Cities, communities, etc.

KUQ - New Zealand 

1-4890.........New Zealand

KV - Pacific Area Regional Laws. Countries (A-Ne)

KVB - Regional comparative and uniform law: Australia and New Zealand 

1-999.........Regional comparative and uniform law: Australia and New Zealand

KVC - Regional comparative and uniform law: Other Pacific area jurisdictions 

1-9999.........Regional comparative and uniform law: Other Pacific area jurisdictions

KVE - Regional organization and integration 

200-349.........Regional organization and integration

KVH - American Samoa. British New Guinea 

1-490.........American Samoa

1001-1499.........British New Guinea (Territory of Papua)

KVL - Cook Islands 

1-489.........Cook Islands

KVM - Easter Island 

1-489.........Easter Island

KVN - Fiji 

1-490.........Fiji

KVP - French Polynesia. German New Guinea 

1-100.........French Polynesia

1001-1099.........German New Guinea (to 1914)

KVQ - Guam 

1-490.........Guam

KVR - Kiribati 

1-490.........Kiribati

KVS - Marshall Islands. Micronesia. Midway Islands 

1-490.........Marshall Islands

501-990.........Micronesia (Federated States)

2501-2999.........Midway Islands

KVU - Nauru. Netherlands New Guinea 

1-499.........Nauru

1001-1099.........Netherlands New Guinea (to 1963)

KVW - New Caledonia

1-490.........New Caledonia

KW - Pacific Area. Countries (Ni-Z). Antarctica

KWA - Niue 

1-489.........Niue

KWC - Northern Mariana Islands 

1-490.........Northern Mariana Islands

KWE - Pacific Islands Trust Territory 

1-490.........Pacific Islands Trust Territory

KWG - Palau 

1-490.........Palau

KWH - Papua New Guinea 

1-490.........Papua New Guinea

KWL - Pitcairn Island. Solomon Islands 

1-499.............Pitcairn Island

2001-2490.........Solomon Islands

KWP - Tonga 

1-490.........Tonga

KWQ - Tuvalu 

1-490.........Tuvalu

KWR - Vanuatu 

1-490.........Vanuatu

KWT - Wake Island. Wallis and Futuna Islands 
1-489.........Wake Island

2001-2490.........Wallis and Futuna Islands

KWW - Western Samoa 

1-490.........Western Samoa

KWX - Antarctica 

1-950.........Antarctica

KZ - Law of Nations. Law of Seas. Law of Space

KZ - Law of Nations 
2-6795................Law of Nations
2-5.5................Bibliography
24-38................Societies, etc.
27-37...............National
(60)-62.5............Intergovernmental congresses and conferences
(63)-1152............Sources. Fontes juris gentium
118-194.............Treaties and other international agreements
119-165............To 1920
170-173............1920
176-182.5..........Boundary treaties
183-183.5..........Treaties of arbitration, investigation, etc.
184-194............Peace treaties
199-218.............Judicial decisions and arbitral awards. Law reports
221-1152............By region or country
1165-1208............Trials
1168-1208...........War crime trials
1234-1236............Legal research. Legal bibliography
1249-1252............International law and other disciplines
1255-1273............Theory and principles
1267-1273...........Domain of the law of nations
1284-1285.5..........Methodology
1287-1296............Codification of the law of nations
1298-1304............The law of treaties. System of treaty law
(1319)-(1327)........International legal regimes
1329-3085............Early/Medieval development to ca. 1900. Ius Naturae et Gentium
1330-1339...........Peace of Westphalia to the French Revolution (1648-1789)
1345-1369...........French Revolution to the American Civil War (1789-1861)
1373-1387.2.........American Civil War to the First Conference of the Hague (1861-1899)
2064-3085...........Publicists. Writers on public international law
3092-3405............20th century
3110-3405...........Publicists. Writers on public international law
3410.................21st century
3670-3881............Objects of the law of nations. Territory and its different parts
3900-(5490)..........The international legal community and members
3910-(5490).........Subjects of the law of nations
4002-4080..........The state
4110...............By region
4112-4820..........By state
4850-(5490)........Intergovernmental organizations. IGOs
4853-(4934).......The League of Nations
(4935)-5275.......The United Nations
(5330)-(5490).....Regional organizations
5510-6299............International law of peace and peace enforcement
5586-5893...........The system of collective security
5615-5893..........Arms control and disarmament regimes
5637-5645..........Conventional arms control
5647-5686..........Nuclear (Strategic) arms limitation
5687-5788.5........Nuclear weapon free zones and zones of peace
5834-5865..........Other weapons of mass destruction
5870-5893..........Mutual and balanced reduction of armed forces
5900-5967...........Military pact systems for collective self-defense
6009-6299...........Pacific settlement of international disputes and conflict resolution
6115-6299..........Arbitration and adjudication
6350-6785............Enforced settlement of international disputes
6360-6373...........Non-military coercion
6374-(6377).........Threat of force
6378-6785...........Law of war and neutrality. Jus belli
6427-6437..........Warfare on land
6440-6530..........Humanitarian law
6540-6660..........Warfare on sea
6665-6714..........Air warfare
6730-6795..........The end of war. Armistice. Surrender. Postliminy

KZA - Law of the sea 

1040-1065.........Intergovernmental congresses and conferences
1118-1122.........Treaties and other international agreements
1340-1417.........Concepts and principles
1340.............Mare clausum doctrine
1348-1405........Mare liberum doctrine
1430-1690.........Maritime boundaries
1630-1664........Continental shelf
(3481)-(3900).....Marine resources conservation and development
(3891)-(3900)....High-seas fisheries and fisheries regimes
4130-(4205).......Public order of the oceans

KZD - Space law. Law of outer space 

1040-1065.........Intergovernmental congresses and conferences
1118-1122.........Treaties and other international agreements
1340-1400.........Concepts and principles. Theory
1390-1400........Regulated use theory
1410..............The source of the law of space
1420-1455.........Boundaries
3489-4406.........Peaceful uses of outer space
3489.5-3608......Space resources
4030-4326........Public order in space and outer space
4080-4210.......Space flight
(4301)-4310.....Space communication
4320.2-4326......Rescue operations in outer space
4440-4406........Liability for accidents
5614-6715.........Un-peaceful uses of outer space
5620-5622.2......Treaties and other international agreements
5648-5680.2......Disarmament and demilitarization regimes in outer space

Notes

References

Further reading 
 Full schedule of all LCC Classifications
 List of all LCC Classification Outlines

K